Bloomer may refer to:

 Bloomer, a type of loaf of bread – a crusty loaf with rounded ends, and typically with several parallel diagonal slashes across its top
 Bloomers (clothing), a type of clothing for women
 LNWR Bloomer Class, an early British railway locomotive
 Bloomer potato, a potato variety

People
 Bloomer (surname)
 Bloomer Bloomfield, nickname for American astronaut Michael J. Bloomfield

Places in the United States
 Bloomer, Indiana, unincorporated community
 Bloomer, Ohio, unincorporated community
 Bloomer, Wisconsin, city
 Bloomer (town), Wisconsin
 Bloomer Township, Michigan
 Bloomer Township, Marshall County, Minnesota

Other uses
 Bloomer Girl, a 1944 Broadway musical
 Bloomer Shippers Connecting Railroad, serving east-central Illinois
 Early bloomer, early physical maturation

See also
Bloomers (disambiguation)